Kahror Pakka is a tehsil of the Lodhran District of Punjab, Pakistan. It is located 27 kilometres east of the district capital of Lodhran.

Demography 
As of the 1988 census, the population of the tehsil is 361,532
.

Weather 
The climate is very hot and dry in summer and cool in winter. The hottest months are May to September. The maximum and minimum temperatures are 46 and 28 degree Celsius respectively. The coldest months are December to February. During this period the temperature fluctuates between 21 and 5 Celsius. The average annual rainfall is 71 millimeters.

References 

Populated places in Lodhran District